Dorothea Ruth Etchells (17 April 19318 August 2012) was an English poet and college principal who spent most of her working life in the University of Durham.

Early life 
She was born on 17 April 1931. She attended Merchant Taylors’ School and the University of Liverpool. After graduation, she became an English teacher at Aigburth Vale High School in Liverpool and then a lecturer at the Chester College of Higher Education.

Career 
From 1968, she taught in the English Department and soon became Vice Principal of Trevelyan College. In 1979 she was appointed Principal of St John's College, Durham, a notable appointment because this made her both the first lay person and the first woman to be principal of a Church of England college, Cranmer Hall (part of St. John's), that trains clergy, who were in those days only male.

She was a member of the Church of England's Crown Appointments Commission that recommends appointments of the bishops and archbishops, including the Archbishop of Canterbury. In 1992 she was awarded a Lambeth Doctor of Divinity degree.

Bibliography

Her many books include:

References

1931 births
2012 deaths
Academics of Durham University
English women poets
Holders of a Lambeth degree
20th-century English poets
20th-century English women writers
Principals of St John's College, Durham